In Greek mythology, Parthenopaeus  or Parthenopaios (Ancient Greek: Παρθενοπαῖος, Parthenopaîos) was one of the Seven against Thebes, a native of Arcadia, described as young and outstandingly good-looking, but at the same time arrogant, ruthless and over-confident, although an unproblematic ally for the Argives.

Mythology

Early life
Parthenopaeus was the son of Atalanta by either her husband Hippomenes (Melanion), or by Meleager, or Ares. A less common version makes him a son of Talaus and Lysimache (which makes him a close relative of the other members of the Seven and thereby motivates his involvement in the war). Hyginus writes that he was left exposed by Atalanta on Mount Parthenius ("virginal") in Arcadia, so that she could conceal the fact that she was not a virgin anymore; the name Parthenopaeus is accordingly interpreted by Hyginus as "seemingly-virginal" or the like, as if referring to the fact that his mother was pretending to still be a virgin. He was subsequently rescued by a shepherd, along with Telephus, the son of Auge and Heracles, who had been abandoned on the same mountain, and the two boys were good friends. Parthenopaeus went with Telephus to Teuthrania, where he helped him repulse Idas's invasion of the kingdom of Teuthras.

Euripides noted that Parthenopaeus moved from Arcadia to Argos at a young age, and seemed to have enjoyed a friendly reception from the Argives.

War on Thebes
Parthenopaeus was persuaded by Adrastus to join in the war against Thebes. During the attack on Thebes, Parthenopaeus was the assailant on the Electran Gates, or, alternatively, the Neitian Gates. In Aeschylus' Seven Against Thebes, he is portrayed carrying a shield with the image of Sphinx devouring the Thebans, and swearing by his spear (which for him is said to be more sacred than gods, and more precious than his own sight) to destroy the city even despite the will of Zeus. Yet according to Euripides, on the shield was depicted his mother shooting a wild boar. He was confronted by Actor at the gate. 
Parthenopaeus was killed by either Periclymenus, or Amphidicus (Asphodicus), a son of Astacus. According to Euripides, Periclymenus killed him by heaving a load of stones on his head.

Parthenopaeus is given a detailed treatment in Book 9 of Statius' Thebaid, which concludes with his aristeia and death. Yet Statius' version differs considerably from those cited above. In the poem, Parthenopaeus fights fiercely and vigorously, killing a number of opponents, and dismisses the advice of his tutor Dorceus, who calls on him to be more careful. In the meantime Atalanta, tormented by nightmares of his non-return, prays to Artemis that he may survive, or at least die a glorious death. Eventually Ares, instigated by his mistress Aphrodite, makes Artemis retreat from the battlefield and causes Dryas, a son of Orion, to attack and dissolve the Arcadian contingent.  Parthenopaeus, intimidated, still attempts to shoot Dryas but the latter mortally wounds him with a spear thrown, and is instantly himself killed by someone whose identity remains unrevealed. Parthenopaeus dies in the arms of his companions, giving last instructions to Dorceus, and admitting that he must have been too young to go to war.

In the Aeneid, the ghost of Parthenopaeus, along with those of other members of the Seven, is glimpsed by Aeneas in the Underworld.

The son of Parthenopaeus by the nymph Clymene, variously named Promachus, Tlesimenes or Stratolaus, was one of the Epigoni.

Notes

Characters in Seven against Thebes
Characters in Book VI of the Aeneid
Family of Athamas
Children of Ares
Demigods in classical mythology
Argive characters in Greek mythology